To Escape the Stars is a 1978 science fiction novel by US editor and writer Robert Hoskins.

Synopsis 
The book is the third of three in the Stars sequence, which is loosely based upon an earlier novel, The Problem Makers. It is set 100,000 years into the future, 10,000 years after the previous novel, where gate travel between worlds is common, even for transporting raw materials. 

The novel has two distinct parts, the first describing the bad behavior of the protagonist, the second describing the renewed search for the advanced aliens from Alnia. The book's hero and protagonist is James Oregas, a selfish coloniser of planets.

Reception 
Mary Weinkauf, reviewing from Science Fiction and Fantasy Book Review, described it as picaresque and criticised its theme, interest, and originality.

B. C. Hacker writing in Library Journal described it as a good story.

References

External links 
 Open Library edition information

Science fiction book series
1977 American novels
American science fiction novels